"Celestial Soda Pop" is a song written and composed by Ray Lynch for his third album, Deep Breakfast. The song has been considered to be the highlight of the album.

Composition
The song was composed in C# minor and features a repetitive progression performed on a synthesizer.

Reception
In reviewing Lynch's album No Blue Thing, Keith Tuber of Orange Coast called "Celestial Soda Pop" a "monster New Age Hit". Meanwhile, in reviewing Deep Breakfast, P.J. Birosik of Yoga Journal called "Celestial Soda Pop" a "wonderfully memorable little tune". Steve Korte of CD Review referred to the song as "a standard that you've probably heard dozens of times in your local supermarket or dentist's office". However, John Schaefer, author of New Sounds: A Listener's Guide to New Music, referred to the piece as a "vacuous title" and claimed that Lynch possesses "limited ability on the synthesizer".

Remixes
In 1998, Ray Lynch produced a techno remix of "Celestial Soda Pop" for his compilation album, Ray Lynch: Best Of, Volume One. The song was later remixed by Boreta of The Glitch Mob in 2015.

In popular culture
In 1986, "Celestial Soda Pop" was used as a theme song for the NPR show Fresh Air. The track was also featured in the 1987 documentary film, Downwind/Downstream. On May 26, 1990, Joel Selvin of the San Francisco Chronicle commented that the use of the song by NPR probably caused Deep Breakfast to have a "considerable boost" in sales. In 1991, the Stone Mountain Laser Show near Atlanta began using "Celestial Soda Pop" as one of the tracks in the show, set to animated shapes and colors.

References

New-age songs
1984 songs